BBBS may refer to:
Big Brothers Big Sisters (disambiguation), an organization in various countries
Bukit Bintang Boys' Secondary School (Malaysia)

See also
 BBB (disambiguation) for the singular of BBBs